Isa Mazzei is an American producer and screenwriter. She wrote and produced Blumhouse’s CAM, a psychological thriller on Netflix starring Madeline Brewer. She is also the author of CAMGIRL, a memoir from Rare Bird Books.

Early life
Mazzei grew up in Boulder, Colorado after spending her early years in California. She is the daughter of a director of photography and a make-up artist. She is a graduate of the University of California, Berkeley, where she received a degree in Comparative Literature in 2013. After college, she went on to hold a variety of jobs, including working as a camgirl online.

Career
Mazzei began writing professionally in 2016 with the screenplay for CAM, loosely based on her own experience as a camgirl. She was awarded Best Screenplay for CAM at the Fantasia International Film Festival in 2018. Her first book, a memoir entitled CAMGIRL, was published in November 2019. Her writing has been featured in New York Magazine’s The Cut. In 2019, she co-wrote and produced an episode of 50 States of Fright for Quibi, starring Christina Ricci. She is also acting as an advisor for the Sundance Institute's Co//ab program.

Filmography

Film

Television and streaming media

Bibliography 
CAMGIRL (2019)

References

External links

Living people
University of California, Berkeley alumni
People from Boulder, Colorado
Screenwriters from Colorado
American film producers
Webcam models
Year of birth missing (living people)